Inteqam ( "Revenge") is an Indian action film directed by Rajkumar Kohli and released in 1988. It stars Sunny Deol, Anil Kapoor, Meenakshi Sheshadri, Kimi Katkar in lead roles.

Story
The life of Birju (Sunny Deol) is turned upside down when his sister Chhaya (Kimi Katkar) is raped and the unscrupulous defence attorney Dinanath concocts a false case to malign her. This causes their father to suffer a massive heart attack and die right in the court. Their mother also dies right there from the shock. Ashamed and devastated, Chhaya runs out of the court in grief and is hit by a passing truck and dies in Birju's arms.

Filled with vengeance and hatred, Birju decides to take inteqam (revenge) from Dinanath and his family. He goes to Dinanath's house, cuts off his tongue and kidnaps his sister Seeta (Meenakshi Sheshadri). He then hands her over to a brothel madam by the name of Zohra Bai (Aruna Irani) so that she is condemned to a life of prostitution. Birju then proceeds to find Dinanath's younger brother as his next target.

Meanwhile, Dinanath's younger brother Vikram (Anil Kapoor), who works as a taxi driver, searches the city desperately for his sister and her kidnapper. One night he rescues Birju from some local goons, not knowing his real identity. Birju introduces himself as Vijay, a name that he has adopted in order to evade the police, while Vikram introduces himself as Vicky. Both become very good and inseparable friends, neither one knowing that they are searching for each other.

While living with Vikram, Birju meets Chandni (also Kimi Katkar), who is a spitting image of his late sister Chhaya. He thus adopts her as his own sister. He also develops a soft spot for Seeta, who is now known as Sitara Bai; after he rescues her from Narayan, he plans to marry her.

However, Narayan learns the truth about Birju, Vikram and Seeta and uses it to his advantage. He reveals to Vikram the true identity of Birju and the two friends engage in a fight with each other. Narayan uses this opportunity to take Seeta and Chandni with him. Birju and Vikram eventually decide to set aside their differences and go after Narayan to rescue Seeta and Chandni. During the ensuing brawl, Vikram's brother Dinanath sacrifices his own life to save Birju, thus atoning for his sins. Narayan is then arrested by the police and taken to prison. Birju marries Seeta.

Cast
 Sunny Deol as Birju / Vijay
 Anil Kapoor as Vikram / Vicky
 Meenakshi Sheshadri as Seeta / Sitara Bai
 Kimi Katkar as Chhaya / Chandni (Dual Role)
 Ashok Kumar as Raghuveer
 Nirupa Roy as Raghuveer's Wife
 Prem Chopra as Advocate Dinanath
 Shakti Kapoor as Jacob
 Kader Khan as Narayan
 Amjad Khan as Murli
 Aruna Irani as Zohra Bai
 Dalip Tahil as Balwant

Songs
Lyricist: Anand Bakshi

 "Bhai Kiska Hai Iska Hai" - Kavita Krishnamurthy, Mohammed Aziz, Nitin Mukesh
 "Jaise Ik Chaand Ka Tukadaa" - Kavita Krishnamurthy, Mohammed Aziz, Nitin Mukesh
 "Mujhe Uss Sitamagar Kee Surat Dikha Do" - Kavita Krishnamurthy
 " Ab Main Naachoongi" - Anuradha Paudwal
 "Main Jawaan Ho Gayee" - Mohammed Aziz, Anuradha Paudwal

References

External links
 

1988 films
1980s Hindi-language films
Films scored by Laxmikant–Pyarelal
Indian films about revenge
Indian crime action films